Quick 1888 (also referred to as Quick Nijmegen) is an amateur sporting club from Nijmegen, Netherlands. It was founded in 1888 as a cricket club and currently plays football in the third amateur level.

As a football club, Quick reached its moment of fame in 1949 when it won the Dutch Cup of which a replica is on display in the club house. Afterwards the club lost the final of the 1949 Dutch Supercup against Schiedamse Voetbal Vereniging. The club also has a badminton, athletics and a field hockey branch.

Dutch international football players
 Felix von Heijden 	1
 Henk Steeman 	1
 Piet Velthuizen 	1

Cricket
As a cricket club, Quick has produced a number of national representatives in both men's and women's cricket. Most recently, two members represented the Netherlands national women's cricket team at the 2008 Women's Cricket World Cup Qualifier.
The club is affiliated with the Koninklijke Nederlandse Cricket Bond. It currently has four teams, two senior men's, one women's and a veterans team, making it the largest cricket club in the east of the Netherlands.

Tennis
Quick has two tennis fields.

External links
Official club website

Football clubs in the Netherlands
Football clubs in Nijmegen
Association football clubs established in 1888
1888 establishments in the Netherlands
Cricket teams in the Netherlands
Multi-sport clubs in the Netherlands